The Grandissimes: A Story of Creole Life is a novel by George Washington Cable, published as a book in 1880 by Charles Scribner's Sons after appearing as a serial in Scribner's. The historical romance depicts race and class relations in New Orleans at the start of the 19th century, immediately following the Louisiana Purchase in 1803. The book examines the lives and loves of the extended Grandissime family, which includes members from different races and classes in Creole society. The novel juxtaposes a romanticized version of the French Creole culture with the atrocities committed under the European-American system of slavery in the United States.

Key characters
Honoré Grandissime, the head of the French/white part of the prominent Grandissime family of New Orleans
Honoré Grandissime, the mulatto half-brother of the white Honoré Grandissime
Joseph Frowenfeld, a Philadelphia native and abolitionist
Agricola Fusilier, Honoré Grandissime's uncle, who seeks to preserve slavery, the foundation of the European Grandissime family's way of life
Aurora Nancanou, a destitute widow whose husband was murdered by Fusilier in a gambling dispute
Palmyre, Aurora Nancanou's slave maid
Bras Coupé, an enslaved African prince on a Spanish Creole plantation, also Palmyre's fiancé

Plot
Honoré Grandissime, head of the French Creole family, takes in Joseph Frowenfeld, whose family has died of yellow fever. He describes the New Orleans caste system, which had three racial groups, to Frowenfeld, an abolitionist. His desire to end slavery would destroy the labor base of the plantations, which revenues supported city life. Frowenfeld and Grandissime's uncle Agricola Fusilier, soon get into a dispute. Fusilier seeks to preserve the Grandissime way of life, which means continuing slavery.

Grandissime and his quadroon half brother, also named Honoré Grandissime, want to go into business together. Grandissime also wants to help Aurora Nancanou, widowed since Fusilier killed her husband. Grandissime is secretly in love with her.

Grandissime later tries to help Bras Coupé, a slave engaged to Palmyre, Aurora's maid. After Coupé attacks his white overseer, a mob of Creole aristocrats, including Fusilier, captures the slave as he tries to escape through swamps outside the city. Grandissime tries to intervene, but the mob brutally lynches Coupé, in an act demonstrating the darkness at the heart of their society.

Adaptations
The book is known for its descriptions of local dialects and the practice of plaçage, a recognized extralegal system in which ethnic European men entered into the equivalent of common-law marriages with African and mixed-race women (primarily of African and European descent). Generally the young woman's mother negotiated a dowry, freedom for the woman and her children if she were a slave, and possibly education for her (future) children. Typically young men would have a plaçage arrangement before getting formally married to a wife of European descent; others kept their mixed-race mistresses after marriage. The mixed-race children of such arrangements became the Creoles of color, free people of color who spoke a French-based Creole language, practiced Catholicism, and established a social class or caste between those of the ethnic Europeans and the predominantly-African slaves. Many became artisans and property owners.

The book features an adaptation of the story of Bras-Coupé, the fictitious name of a fugitive slave named Squire who was lynched in 1837.

The novel was adapted for the opera Koanga, with music by Frederick Delius.

Willa Cather's short story "The Dance at Chevalier's" was influenced by Cable's work; it has been described as "a cross between George Washington Cable's The Grandissimes (1880) and Anthony Hope's Prisoner of Zenda (1894)".

References

External links
George Washington Cable, The Grandissimes, via Project Gutenberg
"Bio of Cable and Summary of novel: The Grandissimes: A Story of Creole Life", Documenting the American South, The University of North Carolina at Chapel Hill

1880 American novels
Novels first published in serial form
Charles Scribner's Sons books
Louisiana Creole culture
1880 debut novels